Just a Gigolo is a 1931 American Pre-Code romantic comedy film released by MGM. It was directed by Jack Conway, produced by Irving Thalberg and starred William Haines, Irene Purcell, C. Aubrey Smith, and Ray Milland. It was adapted from the 1930 play of the same name, which also starred Irene Purcell in the role of Roxana 'Roxy' Hartley. The film features the song "Just a Gigolo".

Plot summary
Lord Robert Brummell (William Haines), an impecunious bachelor, is ordered by his wealthy uncle Lord George Hampton (C. Aubrey Smith) to settle down with a wife. Not wishing to tie himself down to any one girl, Brummell endeavors to prove that no woman is worthy of him by pretending to be a gigolo. When he meets the beautiful, wealthy Roxana Hartley (Irene Purcell), Lord Robert becomes increasingly frustrated when she deftly resists all his techniques of seduction. But his realisation that he loves her occurs at the same time that Roxana discovers his true identity and decides to pay him back.

Cast
 William Haines as Lord Robert 'Bobby' Brummel
 Irene Purcell as Roxana 'Roxy' Hartley
 C. Aubrey Smith as Lord George Hampton
 Charlotte Granville as Lady Jane Hartley
 Lilian Bond as Lady Agatha Carrol
 Ray Milland as Freddie
 Yola d'Avril as Pauline, Roxana's Maid

References

External links
 
 
 
 

1931 films
American black-and-white films
Films directed by Jack Conway
1931 romantic comedy films
Films produced by Irving Thalberg
Metro-Goldwyn-Mayer films
American romantic comedy films
1930s English-language films
1930s American films
Films with screenplays by Richard Schayer
Films about gigolos